Rael Jones is an English composer and multi-instrumentalist. He is best known for scoring Mrs. Harris Goes to Paris, My Cousin Rachel, Suite Française and Harlots.

Career
Rael graduated in Music and Sound Recording from the Tonmeister course at the University of Surrey in 2004. He collaborated with director Mat Whitecross in Oasis: Supersonic and Coldplay: A Head Full of Dreams.

Selected filmography

As composer

Film
 2022 : Mrs. Harris Goes to Paris
 2021 : The Toll
 2021 : Shoplifters of the World
 2018 : The Festival
 2018 : Coldplay: A Head Full of Dreams
 2017 : My Cousin Rachel
 2016 : Kids in Love
 2015 : Suite Française
 2010 : Dazed in Doon

Television
 2022 : Ten Percent
 2020 : The Salisbury Poisonings
 2017-2019 : Harlots
 2018 : Hang Ups
 2017 : Ill Behaviour

Discography
 2020 : Mother Echo
 2018 : Make Me Young, etc EP with Thumpermonkey
 2015 : The Watched Clock EP with Peter Gregson
 2013 : Mandrake

Awards and nominations

References

External links
 
 

Living people

Year of birth missing (living people)
English television composers
English film score composers
English male film score composers
20th-century multi-instrumentalists
21st-century multi-instrumentalists
Musicians from London